Semioscopis osthelderi is a moth in the family Depressariidae. It was described by Rebel in 1936. It is found in Syria.

References

Moths described in 1936
Semioscopis